Yabroud District is a district of the Rif Dimashq Governorate in southern Syria. Administrative centre is the city of Yabroud. At the 2004 census, the district had a population of 48,370.

Sub-districts
The district of Yabroud is divided into two sub-districts or nawāḥī (population as of 2004):

Localities in Yabroud District
According to the Central Bureau of Statistics (CBS), the following villages, towns and cities, make up the district of Yabroud:

References

 
Districts of Rif Dimashq Governorate